The enzyme L-rhamnono-1,4-lactonase (EC 3.1.1.65) catalyzes the reaction

L-rhamnono-1,4-lactone + H2O  Lrhamnonate

This enzyme belongs to the family of hydrolases, specifically those acting on carboxylic ester bonds. The systematic name is L-rhamnono-1,4-lactone lactonohydrolase. Other names in common use include Lrhamno-γ-lactonase, L-rhamnono-γ-lactonase, and L-rhamnonate dehydratase. This enzyme participates in fructose and mannose metabolism.

References

 

EC 3.1.1
Enzymes of unknown structure